Power Rangers Wild Force is the 2002 Power Rangers season that tells the story of the Wild Force Power Rangers and their fight against the Orgs.

Wild Force Power Rangers
The Wild Force Rangers are granted mystical powers and charged to protect the Earth from pollution-created creatures called Orgs. More specifically, they defend the fictional city of Turtle Cove, and are stationed aboard a flying island called the Animarium. Their mentor is Princess Shayla, and her mentor is Animus (an ancient Megazord). The Rangers represent the Ancient Animarium Warriors who also fought to destroy the Orgs and saved the Earth. The Rangers morph using devices known as Growl Phones, which can also act as regular cell phones for communication purposes. Each Ranger is also armed with a Crystal Saber (into which an Animal Crystal is inserted to call a Wild Zord). In addition to piloting their Wild Zords, the Rangers pilot other vehicles, like the Soul Bird and the Savage Cycles. When the Rangers put their weapons together they create the Jungle Sword, which can be used by the Red Ranger to defeat certain enemies. The Rangers have displayed claws on their gloves while morphed. The Yellow Ranger, additionally, has wing-like flaps under her arms, giving her the ability to fly and glide on currents of wind.

Cole Evans
Cole Evans is the main protagonist and the Red Lion Ranger. He is the son of scientists Richard and Elizabeth Evans, who were killed by Master Org 20 years prior. Cole, a baby at the time, was found and raised by a jungle tribe of natives. This life gave him an incredible connection to nature which greatly prepared him to be a Ranger. He has amazing agility, sharp senses, and thinks on his feet. When the natives felt Cole was old enough, they gave him a few items they found on him as a baby - a picture of his parents, and the Red Lion animal crystal and sent him on a quest to find his destiny. With only these two things to go on, Cole left the wilderness for the city of Turtle Cove. Shortly after, he was found by Princess Shayla and the Rangers, and chosen by the Red Lion to be the Red Wild Force Ranger.

Cole has a love for animals and the wilderness. He immediately fell in love with his new home on the Animarium. His connection with nature allows him to communicate with animals, including the Wild Zords. Cole is the only Ranger who can understand the Wild Zords when they speak to the Rangers telepathically. He once tried to appeal to the heart of an Org, only to find with his senses that the Org had none. Cole is a bit inexperienced in the ways of the civilized man, but approaches each new challenge with zeal, such as learning to ride his Savage Cycle.

Cole, despite being the rookie of the team, was appointed its leader, just as the lion is the king of the jungle. Cole believes that there is good in all living creatures, despite the lack of hearts in Orgs. Cole even forgave the late Viktor Adler for the murder of his parents, placing flowers on Adler's grave. After the Wild Force was disbanded, Cole used his talents to help animals. The original script to "The End Of The Power Rangers" mentions that he would become a veterinarian. This scene was filmed, but it was ultimately cut and is not seen in the version of the episode that was aired. In "Reinforcements from the Future", Cole was the only one who believed Ransik was remorseful for his part in creating the MutOrgs.

Following the defeat of the Orgs crew he would give up his powers along with his teammates, but they would later reclaim them in order to battle the Warstar Armada alongside the Megaforce Rangers, who also fought with the aid of Cole's Red Lion Zord.

As the Red Ranger, Cole fights with the ferocity of the Blazing Lion. He is also equipped with the Red Lion Fang, Lion Blaster, Falcon Summoner, the Falconator, and the Animarium Armor. His Power Animals are the Red Lion, the Green Gorilla, and the Ruby Falcon Wildzords. He would later join his teammates in the final battle with the Armada forces in Super Megaforce.

Cole is played by Ricardo Medina, Jr. (who would later portray Deker in Power Rangers Samurai).

Taylor Earhardt
Taylor Earhardt is the Yellow Eagle Ranger. As a young girl, Taylor looked out an airplane window and saw the Animarium. She later landed on it while serving in the Air Force, and found Princess Shayla then became the leader of the group until Cole joined. Taylor was the first Wild Force Ranger to be recruited and had served as a Ranger for over a year prior to being replaced as leader by Cole Evans, the Red Ranger and rookie of the team, much to her objection. Taylor's military past has made her rather regimental, tomboyish, arrogant and hardened, leading her to write a code book for the team; she rudely knocks Cole out with a gut punch, telling him he's been "drafted", when Danny was explaining being a Ranger. The jealousy she felt towards Cole deepened when he rejected it. But in time, she became gentler and humbler.

When she teamed up with the Time Force Rangers to defeat the Mut-Orgs, Taylor quickly became furious with Eric Myers, the Quantum Ranger, because since he pulled her over and gave her a speeding ticket, though they eventually gained something of a mutual respect. Eric even lent her the Quantum Defender in battle.

After the final battle with Master Org, Taylor gave up her Ranger powers and returned to the Air Force, where she was looked up to as a legend by the younger members. She frequently meets the Yellow Eagle Zord in the sky.

She would later return for the final battle in Super Megaforce. 

As the Yellow Ranger, she has the grace of the Soaring Eagle. She is also equipped with the Golden Eagle Sword, Soaring Darts, and Armadillo Puck. Her Wild Zords are the Soaring Eagle, and Bear Brothers Zords (a Black Bear and a Polar Bear).

Taylor is played by Alyson Kiperman.

Max Cooper
Max Cooper is the Blue Shark Ranger, and was the third Wild Force Ranger to be recruited and both he and Alyssa were Rangers for roughly six months prior to Cole joining the team. Max became a Power Ranger when he aided two girls in escaping from Turbine Org. After Taylor and Alyssa successfully chased off the Org, the Blue Shark animal crystal materialized in Max's pocket and he became the Blue Wild Force Power Ranger. He is best friends with Danny Delgado, the Black Ranger. Max was originally training to be a pro-bowler when he became a Power Ranger. When he quit, he lost the respect of his teacher. Max later returned to learn his mentor's ultimate bowling technique called the Tornado Spin for use against Bowling Org. After much convincing, his teacher taught him the move.

Max is considered the "kid" of the group, which he resents, but it's because of his youth and childlike behavior. He constantly tries to prove himself, leading to cockiness and aggressiveness on his part. He brings a sense of humor to the Rangers, and is a master of improvisation. He usually calls the Blue Shark "Sharky", implying that they share a very strong bond.

After surrendering their powers, Max and Danny left Turtle Cove together and went on a long vacation around the world, something they like to call the "Never Give Up" tour. They later returned to battle alongside their teammates and other veteran Rangers in Super Megaforce.

As the Blue Ranger, he commands the Blue Shark Wild Zord, Polar Bear Zord (shared with Taylor), and the Orange Giraffe Zord. He is also equipped with the Blue Shark Fighting Fins and the Sword of Pardolis. 

Max is played by Phillip Jeanmarie.

Danny Delgado
Daniel "Danny" Delgado is the Black Bison Ranger. His motto is "Never give up" which is mentioned several times during the season. Most times, Max Cooper, the Blue Ranger, would have to remind him what that motto is whenever he feels like giving up. He works at a flower shop, where he is very passionate about the flowers. He has a fear of heights which is shown when trying to retrieve the Giraffe Zord crystal after he knocked it out of Toxica's hand. Danny was the fourth Ranger to be recruited and had served as a Ranger for two months prior to Cole joining the team.

Danny is the strongest Wild Force Ranger physically, but deep inside is a peaceful man, with a sweet side and some childish quirks (like sleeping with a Teddy Bear). He is in love with a girl named Kendall, who works in the same flower shop as he, but he is too shy to tell her, and gets (even more) clumsy when she is nearby. Eventually, she found out that he was the Black Ranger, but decided that he needed to focus on his mission, and turned him down. When the Rangers disbanded, he and Max embarked on a global vacation, visiting different cities around the world. According to an earlier script, Kendall was supposed to join them. Danny also appeared as part of the Ranger army in Super Megaforce.

While Cole was originally thought of as the only Wild Force Ranger who could understand the Wild Zords (a trait which Merrick also probably shared), Danny has been shown on more than one occasion to be able to understand the Bison Zord. Whether he can talk to anyone else's Zords remains unknown. Besides the Bison Zord, Danny also commands the Rhinoceros Zord and the Armadillo Zord. He is also equipped with the Black Bison Axe and the Rhino Shooter.

Danny is played by Jack Guzman.

Alyssa Enrilé
Alyssa Enrilé is the White Tiger Ranger. She was the second Ranger to join the team (after Taylor and before Max, Danny and Cole). She is the kind, nurturing member of the group. When any Ranger is injured, she is right there tending to their wounds. Alyssa tries to defuse any tension between team members. Being a benevolent girl, Alyssa often was in the position of peacekeeper. In the early days of the team, Alyssa tried to keep peace between Cole and Taylor who would get conflicting ideas on what was best for the team. She would cook for the team and even read stories to Danny and Max. She has a fondness for animals, and also proves so heroic she would risk her own life to save those in need morphed or unmorphed. There have been a few hints that Alyssa may have a crush on Cole. When Alyssa wasn't fighting Orgs, she stayed active by riding her bike to school and taking dance classes at Turtle Cove University.

Alyssa was trained in the martial arts by her father, who is a renowned martial arts instructor. He intended for her to eventually take over running his school, and was heartbroken when Alyssa decided to move to Turtle Cove and attend Turtle Cove University. One day when he visited his daughter, he was proud to discover that not only was she a Ranger, but she had excelled in the martial arts he taught her. As a result, he accepted her decision to continue her education.

When the Orgs were defeated, Alyssa was relieved of her life as a Ranger. She finished college and became a kindergarten teacher. In the last episode, she is seen telling her story to her class in a fairy tale fashion, making her the narrator of the finale.

As the White Wild Force Ranger, Alyssa fights with the guile and agility of the Noble Tiger. She is also equipped with the White Tiger Baton and the Deer Clutcher. Her Power Animals are the White Tiger, the Cyan Elephant, the Black Bear (shared with Taylor), and the Jade Deer Wildzords.

Alyssa is played by Jessica Rey.

Merrick Baliton
Merrick Baliton is the Lunar Wolf Ranger, the sixth Ranger of the series. He was once one of the original six warriors of Animaria. He witnessed the battle between the ancient, evil Master Org and Animus. When Animus fell, Merrick took it upon himself to defeat Master Org. Knowing that he did not have enough power to defeat Master Org alone, he donned a cursed wolf mask which gave him the power of the Duke Org Zen-Aku. With this power, he was able to defeat Master Org. However, he was soon corrupted by the mask's power and Zen-Aku took control of his body. Merrick pleaded with his comrades to kill him before the mask took complete control. But rather than kill Merrick, they sealed him into a stone-coffin in order to protect the world from Zen-Aku's power.

Centuries later, he was released by Nayzor to destroy the Wild Force Rangers. As Zen-Aku, he battled them on several occasions, but he was not all evil. When Alyssa was injured by Jindrax and Toxica, he bandaged her wound while she was unconscious. The fighting went on until the Rangers learned the truth and helped free him from the curse, with help from the Rhino and Armadillo Wild Zords. Princess Shayla had figured out the curse's power was tied to his Zords and had the Rangers destroy his Zords as the Predazord, breaking the curse. Merrick became the Lunar Wolf Ranger and comes to the others aid when needed. Unfortunately, breaking the curse also freed Zen-Aku and he returned to do battle with the Rangers. Merrick had to face his apparently unbeatable dark side, but using a new pool trick he learned from his friend and boss Willie, Merrick weakened Zen-Aku and destroyed him with the help of the Armadillo Zord. Its later revealed that Zen-Aku somehow survived, but he seeks redemption now like Merrick. It is suggested throughout the series that Merrick has long been romantically involved with Princess Shayla, although presumably the guilt he had being under the curse of Zen-Aku, along with his self-imposed exile, prevented them from expressing it for a long while.

Unlike Rangers turned from evil to good in previous series of Power Rangers, Merrick did not immediately join the Wild Force Rangers. He is notable for remaining something of an antihero because of his largely self-imposed exile from Animaria. He, however, befriends a roadside bar operator named Willie, who he convinces to stay as an employee after defending his establishment from thugs. It is hinted that Willie is aware of his identity as a Power Ranger due to his mysterious disappearances. He is an avid player of pool, although he only plays to repeatedly practice one trick shot (the same one used in his Lunar Cue finishing move, which also served to summon his Wild Zords).

In the finale, it is revealed that Merrick has made his peace with the now remorseful Zen-Aku, and that they are traveling the world together both seeking redemption for their actions.

His Silver Wolf, Violet Hammerhead Shark, and Emerald Alligator Wild Zords combine to form the Predazord. He is also equipped with the Lunar Cue that he primarily used as Sniper Mode, Saber Mode or Break Mode, the latter allowing him to perform Full Moon Slash. With Merrick's set of Animal Crystals, his Lunar Cue's Break Mode allows him to perform Laser Pool by summoning his Wild Zords through his billiards skills.

Merrick is played by Philip Andrew.

Zords

Wildzords
The Wildzords are animal zords that reside in the Animarium. Wild Force Rangers summoned the Wildzords by placed the Animal Crystals in the Crystal Sabers when the command "Wildzords, descend." is given. In Merrick's case, his Wildzords rest in their Power Animal Crystals and are usually used as weapons with his Lunar Cue. Under Zen-Aku's corruption, the Wildzords in his possession turn into Dark Wildzords.
 Red Lion Wildzord: Cole Evans' personal Wildzord. It later appeared in Power Rangers Super Megaforce as part of the Legendary Zords to further support the Super Megaforce Rangers in their later battles.
 Yellow Eagle Wildzord: Taylor Earhardt's personal Wildzord.
 Blue Shark Wildzord: Max Cooper's personal Wildzord.
 Black Bison Wildzord: Danny Delgado's personal Wildzord.
 White Tiger Wildzord: Alyssa Enrilé's personal Wildzord.
 Elephant Wildzord: Alyssa Enrilé's secondary Wildzord, it was entombed in a mountain for several years. When Alyssa was exploring a cave on a class trip, she uncovered the Elephant Wildzord, who spoke to her.
 Giraffe Wildzord: Max Cooper's secondary Wildzord, it lay on the bottom of Turtle Cove. When Max fought an Org underwater, the Giraffe Wildzord saved him. Max later found that he was able to summon the Giraffe Wildzord, foretold to him by a vision. Due to its slow movement, it piggybacks onto Blue Shark Wildzord to get to the Wild Force Rangers' aid in certain occasions.
 Black Bear Wildzord and Polar Bear Wildzord: Taylor Earhardt's secondary Wildzord, they originally appeared as mysterious boys in black and white respectively. After Taylor retrieved flowers for Black Bear Wildzord and Polar Bear Wildzord, they gave him two seeds that turned into their Animal Crystals. Black Bear Wildzord uses the power of fire while Polar Bear Wildzord uses the power of ice.
 Gorilla Wildzord: Cole Evans' secondary Wildzord, it appeared during the searching for the Soul Bird, Cole was confronted by Master Org. The Gorilla's growling scared him away, and joined Cole. The Gorilla Wildzord replaced Red Lion Wildzord to form the Kongazord.
 Wolf Wildzord: Merrick Baliton's primary Wildzord. Wolf Wildzord can also transform into Merrick Baliton's Savage Cycle.
 Hammerhead Shark Wildzord: One of Merrick Baliton's additional Wildzord.
 Alligator Wildzord: One of Merrick Baliton's additional Wildzord and the largest Wildzord of all. Under the influence of Predazord Blue Moon, Alligator Wildzord changes its color into blue.
 Armadillo Wildzord: One of Danny Delgado's secondary Wildzord. Along with Rhino Wildzord, was summoned by Black Bison Wildzord to help against Zen-Aku, originally appeared in a miniaturized form in the guise of soccer ball when it gave their crystals to Danny. When not in use as the right foot for Rhino Wildzord's formation, Armadillo Wildzord can be used as makeshift bowling or cue ball depending on the Megazords.
 Rhino Wildzord: One of Danny Delgado's secondary Wildzord.
 Deer Wildzord:  One of Alyssa Enrilé's additional Wildzord. 3,000 years ago, Princess Shayla and Merrick used to sing for the Deer Wildzord every morning but the music stopped, so the Deer Wildzord went into hiding. In present day, the Deer Wildzord return after hearing Princess Shayla humming. To make Deer Wildzord happy again, Princess Shayla and Merrick performed their song, and the Deer Wildzord rejoined the team.
 Falcon Wildzord: Cole Evans' additional Wildzord, it appears to the Wild Force Rangers' aid when most of them were wounded by Super Nayzor, able to be revived by solving a puzzle that enables Cole to obtain the Falcon Summoner.
 Animus Wildzords: The main components of Animus. They are Black Lion Wildzord, Blue Condor Wildzord, Sawshark Wildzord, Brown Buffalo Wildzord and Yellow Jaguar Wildzord.
 Peacock Wildzord, Stingray Wildzord, Zebra Wildzord and Rat Wildzord: Four Wildzords that appear in the final episode, teaming up with the rest of their revived to defeat Master Org.

Megazords
Megazords are giant robots formed from the combination of Wildzords. Any of the default combination are also interchangeable with other Wildzords. Initially, the core five Wild Force Rangers jumped into cockpits prepared by a Megazord, until the Soul Bird dives in to integrate with it for additional strength.
 Wild Force Megazord: The default combination of Red Lion Wildzord, Yellow Eagle Wildzord, Blue Shark Wildzord, Black Bison Wildzord and White Tiger Wildzord. From its Wildzord components, it can fight with Shark Surge and Tiger Fury punches. Its main weapon is the Fin Blade sword. Wild Force Megazord's primary attack is firing beams from the mouths of its component Wildzords in its Wild Force Mega Roar, the attack later enhanced by the Soul Bird into Soul Bird Cannon.
 Wild Force Megazord Sword and Shield: An armament where Elephant Zord forms Elephant Sword and Elephant Shield for the Wild Force Megazord to use, the latter for defensive purposes while the former allows it to perform the Pachyderm Crusher slash.
 Wild Force Megazord Spear: A combination with the Giraffe Wildzord replacing Blue Shark Wildzord as its right arm into Spear of Pardolis, allowing it to perform Giraffe Spear.
 Wild Force Megazord Double Knuckle: A combination with Black Bear Wildzord and Polar Bear Wildzord replacing Shark Wildzord and White Tiger Wildzord as a pair of arms, allowing it to perform the Bear Blasters. Due to the Red Lion Wildzord's power was depleted they placed on Wild Force Megazord, this formation was no longer used in the future.
 Wild Force Megazord Striker: A combination with Rhino Wildzord replacing Black Bison Wildzord as Wild Force Megazord's legs, allowing it to harness soccer skills with Armadillo Wildzord as a makeshift soccer ball. Its finisher is the Final Strike.
 Wild Force Megazord Predator Mode: A formation with Wolf Wildzord and Hammerhead Wildzord as Wild Force Megazord's pair of substitute arms. With Armadillo Wildzord as a makeshift bowling ball, it can perform the tornado spin.
 Wild Force Megazord Predator Spear Mode: A combination with the Giraffe Wildzord replacing Hammerhead Wildzord.
 Wild Force Megazord Clutcher Mode: A combination with the Deer Wildzord replacing White Tiger Wildzord, allowing it to perform the Capture Bubble.
 Wild Force Megazord Spear and Shield Mode: A combination with the Giraffe Wildzord replacing Blue Shark Wildzord, while the Elephant Wildzord's head is attached to the White Tiger Wildzord.
 Wild Force Megazord Spear and Knuckle Mode: A combination with the Giraffe Wildzord replacing Blue Shark Wildzord, while the Black Bear Wildzord replacing White Tiger Wildzord.
 Kongzord: A combination resulted from Gorilla Wildzord, Yellow Eagle Wildzord, Polar Bear Wildzord, Black Bison Wildzord and Black Bear Wildzord. Its main weapon is Kongazord Anchor. Its finishing move is the Double Knuckle — Final Strike.
 Kongazord Striker: A formation with Rhino Wildzord and Armadillo Wildzord replacing Black Bison Wildzord and Yellow Eagle Wildzord as an alternative to the absence of Wild Force Megazord's components. In addition to soccer-like abilities, it can perform the Final Strike attack.
 Kongazord Striker Clutcher: A combination with the Deer Wildzord replacing Black Bear Wildzord.
 Kongazord Striker Spear: A combination with the Giraffe Wildzord replacing Polar Bear Wildzord.
 Predazord: Zen-Aku and Merrick's personal Megazord, formed by the Wolf Wildzord, Hammerhead Shark Wildzord and Alligator Wildzord. Regardless of any variations, its weapons are Crescent Boomerang and Gator Staff. Its default finisher is Predator Wave.
 Dark Predazord: 3,000 years ago, Dark Predazord used by Merrick to destroy Master Org, before Merrick becomes corrupted by the mask and becomes the evil Zen-Aku. Centuries later, Zen-Aku was released by Nayzor to destroy the Wild Force Rangers. As Zen-Aku, he battled them on several occasions, proving to be more than a match in battle - even stealing some of their Wildzords for himself - until the Rangers learned the truth about his past and helped free Merrick from the curse. The Dark Predazord was defeated by Wild Force Megazord Striker, purging it and Merrick from Zen-Aku's influence. Its signature move is the Final Strike.
 Predazord Spear Mode: A combination with Giraffe Wildzord replacing Hammerhead Shark Wildzord as Dark Predazord's right arm, allowing it to perform Crescent Moon Spear attack.
 Predazord Double Knuckle Mode: A combination with Black Bear Wildzord and Polar Bear Wildzord replacing Hammerhead Shark Wildzord and Wolf Wildzord as a pair of arms, allowing it to perform the Bear Blasters.
 Light Predazord: The purified version of Predazord once Merrick was freed from Zen-Aku's control and became the Lunar Wolf Ranger. Light Predazord had a new face without the horn on its head. Its finishing move is the Revolver Phantom.
 Predazord Blue Moon: During the battle against Toy Org, Predazord is temporarily powered up with energy from the blue moon. The finisher move is Blue Moon Wave.
 Isis Megazord: A combination of Falcon Wildzord, Armadillo Wildzord, Giraffe Wildzord, Rhino Wildzord and Deer Wildzord. Through Isis Megazord's wings, it can fly and protect itself in Defense Mode. Using the eye designs on its wings to freeze an Org with Isis Stare, Isis Megazord can destroy an opponent with Final Strike.
 Isis Megazord Predator Mode: An alternative formation of Isis Megazord with Hammerhead Shark Wildzord, Black Bison Wildzord, Wolf Wildzord and the Gator Staff. Its finisher is the Wings of Animaria.
 Pegasus Megazord: A centaur-themed combination of Big Red Lion Wildzord in giant form, Falcon Wildzord, Blue Shark Wildzord, White Tiger Wildzord and Elephant Wildzord. Instead of being formed by the Wild Force Rangers, it was formed on its components' own will to save Princess Shayla was imprisoned in Master Org's lair after she was captured by Onikage.

Animus
Animus is a deity-like Megazord who was said by Princess Shayla to be the direct ancestor of the Rangers' Wild Force Megazord. Animus is composed of the Black Lion, the Buffalo, the Condor, the Sawshark, and the Leopard Wild Zords. 3,000 years ago, he battled against the original Master Org and was destroyed, but his spirit lingers on. In the modern day while the Rangers were fighting Zen-Aku, he appeared to Zen-Aku and urged him to "remember". He later helps the Rangers again, he does this by eclipsing the full moon that was powering Zen-Aku's curse that temporary restored him to Merrick. Animus' spirit later instructed Princess Shayla to help Merrick get the Deer Zord to help the Rangers fight Tombstone Org. After Tombstone Org's destruction, Animus' spirit appears in the sky as the Rangers thank him. Animus' spirit quotes "You're welcome" and disappears. Animus reappeared later as a human boy named "Kite" and befriended the Rangers. As Kite, he first appeared in a dark spiritual dimension where Kite had the Rangers complete a puzzle to get the Falcon Wild Zord. Unknown to the Rangers at the time, they also released Animus' spirit back to the living world, resurrecting him in the form of Kite who was amnesic. As Kite, the Rangers encountered Animus several times and he helped them, particularly against Flute Org when Kite became Animus again for a short time to destroy the monster's flute and then against Lion Tamer Org when Kite broke the monster's hold on the Wild Zords. After he revealed himself as Animus, he took the Wild Zords away after freeing the Wild Force Megazord from Mandilok's control device, feeling that the Rangers were unworthy of their zords as humanity had done so much damage to the world on their own without the Orgs. He offers Merrick a chance to join with him (because of their friendship 3,000 years ago) but Merrick turned him down. After witnessing how truly committed the Rangers are to defending Earth and fight on even without their Zords, as well as seeing ordinary humans risk themselves to save others, Animus reveals that all of this was part of a test that they passed, and he returns the Wild Zords and gives Cole a powerful motorcycle called Savage Cycle to replace the one Cole lost protecting Kite during an earlier battle. Animus reappeared again during the finale as he faces against the Master Org, Merrick assists him with the Predazord. However, Master Org proved to be stronger and destroyed Animus and the Predazord. Animus reverts to the form of Kite before finally dying. The Zord components of Animus were later seen when the Wild Zords do a combined attack with the Rangers to destroy Master Org.

Animus is voiced by Charles Gideon David and Kite is played by Ryan Goldstein.

Allies of the Power Rangers

Princess Shayla
Princess Shayla is the Princess of the Animarium, a floating landmass that is the last remnant of the lost world of Animaria. After the demise of Animus and Master Org, she fell asleep for centuries. However, she was reawakened along with the Org spirits by the pollution caused by humans. Shayla serves as the adviser to the Rangers, as well as filling the role of damsel in distress. However, she can and will defend herself if absolutely necessary. She has a romantic relationship with her former protector, Merrick Baliton, but he refuses to let his feelings get in the way of his duty. Previously before the occurrence of the chaos in her kingdom, Merrick had given to the Princess a necklace, and when kidnapped by Zen-Aku, she tells him that someone very special to her (Merrick) gave it to her a long ago and she wears it in his memory. In "Fishing for a Friend", Master Org grabs the necklace, as it was a magical necklace that has great power. Master Org uses the necklace to protect the Nexus, revive fallen Org generals and also used it in the final ceremony to revive the Org Heart. After Master Org was destroyed, Shayla took back the Wild Force Powers and went back into the sky, until the Wild Zords are needed to protect the earth once more. She was not seen in Super Megaforce, despite the fact that the Super Megaforce Rangers visit Animarium and find the active Red Lion.

Princess Shayla is played by Ann Marie Crouch.

Kendall
Kendall works at a flower shop where Danny used to work before he was chosen to become a Ranger. Danny had a crush on her, but after she learns of his identity as a Power Ranger when Wedding Dress Org attacked. After the Org's defeat, both Kendall and Danny agreed that any chance of them being romantically involved would never be.

Kendall is played by Sandra McCoy.

Willie
Willie is an owner at a road house. After unruly thugs were ejected by Merrick, he allows him to stay with him. He once in a while plays a game of pool with Merrick. It is thanks to a pool trick Willie taught Merrick that the Rangers were able to defeat Zen-Aku when he appeared separate from Merrick and stronger than ever.

Willie is played by J. D. Hall.

Alpha 7
Alpha 7 was the fourth Alpha robot in Power Rangers. He is featured in Forever Red, where he is seen helping Tommy Oliver and Andros on the Astro Megaship Mark II. He has Alpha 5's voice and demeanor, but his appearance is made up of pieces of both Alpha 5 and Alpha 6.

Alpha 7 was voiced by Richard Steven Horvitz (who also voiced Alpha 4 and Alpha 5).

Orgs
Orgs are the Wild Force Rangers' antagonists, pollution-oriented creatures that seek to take over the Earth. An Org's life-force is connected to its horn for if it loses them, it is greatly weakened. Unlike humans, they lack blood (which was a hint that Zen-Aku wasn't a true Org when he had possessed Merrick).

Master Org
Master Org is a name that applies to two villains in the story of Power Rangers: Wild Force. One of them is the original Master Org, who led the battle against the Animarium 3,000 years ago and destroyed Animus. However, that Master Org was destroyed by Merrick Baliton, the guardian of Princess Shayla who was empowered by the evil wolf mask of Zen-Aku. Years later, a human reincarnated "Master Org", the scientist Dr. Viktor Adler and his companions Richard and Elizabeth Evans discovered the seeds that remained of Master Org while on an expedition to prove the existence of the Animarium. Driven by his animosity towards Richard, who unfairly married Elizabeth and had taken the spotlight from him when they announced that they would be searching for the Animarium, Dr. Adler took the seeds secretly, and out of personal revenge, swallowed them and gained the powers of an Org, murdering his companions in cold blood, but never finding Cole. Dr. Adler became the second Master Org wearing a helmet with a fake horn and third eye. He was aided by the Duke Orgs Jindrax and Toxica, who later found out his secret. He temporarily turned them into slaves, but they escaped. After repeated defeats at the hands of the Wild Force Rangers, Dr. Adler fought them himself, but only after revealing to Cole what he did to his parents. In the process, he lost his Org powers and was killed by Mandilok. However, from Dr. Adler's death, the true Master Org was reborn, with a real Org horn and third eye on his forehead. He sent the Duke Org Onikage to arrange for his return. When he arrived, he destroyed Mandilok and kidnapped Shayla. He then invoked a ceremony to create an Org Heart, in which he used the power of Princess Shayla's necklace, summoning Retinax, Nayzor, and Mandilok to guard him. He swallowed the Heart, and his human body crumbled into dust. Unfortunately, Master Org used the Org Heart to create a full-Org body, which resembled a composite of the three General Orgs, and had taken the Nexus Blade as his weapon. He emerged the next day and attacked the Animarium, destroyed the Predazord and Animus, and was seemingly destroyed by the Kongazord Striker, but the Org Heart quickly restored his body. He then proceeded to destroy the Kongazord Striker, as well as every Wild Zord, (therefore, the Rangers lose their powers) and brought the Animarium down to Earth. He attacked Turtle Cove, but was destroyed when the Wild Zords were all revived and countless others combined powers with them. Master Org was hit with an Ultra Roar, and disappeared into nothingness. The Org Heart itself was then destroyed by the Red Lion Ranger and the Lunar Wolf Ranger with the Jungle Sword. With the destruction of Master Org, Dr. Viktor Adler could finally rest in peace.

Master Org is played by Ilia Volok.

Org Generals
The Org Generals (or General Orgs) are higher-ranking Duke Orgs that are Master Org's most powerful servants. They all have a single horn on their heads, a long cape, and are generally themed after some kind of face.

Retinax
Retinax is an eye-themed General Org and the bodyguard of Master Org. His name is a combination of retina and axe. After his master's destruction, he roamed the planet in secrecy, believing he had failed. He was later found by Toxica and Jindrax, who told him Master Org had returned. Seeking to redeem himself, he attempted to destroy the Rangers. However, he was defeated by the Wild Force Megazord (empowered by a newly hatched Soul Bird) and then destroyed by Master Org (whom he did not recognize because he was the human Viktor Adler). Retinax was brought back with the other General Orgs Nayzor and Mandilok to defend the pillars used to protect Master Org during the Org Heart ceremony. He was defeated, but returned fused together with the other Generals as Master Org's new body. In battle, Retinax uses an axe with an eye embedded in it, which also forms part of the Nexus Blade. This General Org can also shoot electricity from his main eye and extend his arms to wrap around enemies.

Retinax is voiced by Michael Sorich.

Nayzor
Nayzor is a nose/ear-themed General Org whose name comes from the word nasal. 3000 years ago, he protected the Animal Crystals of the Dark Wildzords, along with the cursed Wolf Mask needed to control them. He confronted Merrick Baliton when the latter tried to take the crystals, but failed to stop his escape. As a result, Master Org is destroyed by the Predazord, and Merrick becomes corrupted by the mask and becomes the evil Zen-Aku. In the present, Nayzor is revived by Master Org to destroy the Rangers, and unleashes Zen-Aku. When Zen-Aku begins to remember who he is, Nayzor suppresses his memories with a strange insect. After the curse of the Wolf Mask was broken by the Wild Force Rangers, Nayzor gives the Animal Crystals stolen by Zen-Aku to Master Org, who uses them to create the powerful Quadra Org. Along with Jindrax and Toxica, he oversaw the new Org's battle against the Rangers. However, the Org is beaten by Merrick, now the Lunar Wild Force Ranger, forcing Nayzor to join the battle personally. Despite his power, the General Org is defeated and destroyed by Merrick, leaving only his crown behind. Toxica steals the crown to access its power, briefly becoming the General Org Necronomica before her defeat by the Rangers. At Master Org's command, she later revives Nayzor as Super Nayzor, who pounds on the Lunar Wolf Ranger, completely annihilating him. The Rangers join in the fight, but Super Nayzor defeats them too, even knocking them out, save Merrick and Cole, who both charge Nayzor only to be defeated again. Right before the killing blow, Animus intervenes and teleports all the Rangers to safety. Cole and Merrick decide to attack Super Nayzor again, who almost kills them after a lot of fighting, but Cole summoned the Falcon Summoner (a gift from his unconscious teammates who all had a shared dream) and destroyed him. He was then enlarged thanks to Master Org. Cole and his team defeat Super Nayzor with the Isis Megazord. Nayzor is revived in his normal form during the ceremony of the Org Heart, and is ordered to guard one of the pillars protecting the Nexus. He wrecks the Lunar Wolf Ranger and the White Ranger again, but is finally pinned by Merrick, allowing Alyssa to destroy the pillar. He was destroyed again along with the other revived General Orgs and appears later as a part of Master Org's new Org form. In his normal form, Nayzor uses a paper fan that can deflect projectiles back at enemies. The fan is also used in the formation of the Nexus Blade, acting as the hilt of the sword-like weapon. He could also fire electricity from the purple colored gem on his chest. In his Super form, Nayzor used a staff tipped with hook-like claws identical to the ones on his knuckles and feet and could also shoot lightning from his hands and eyes.

Nayzor is voiced by Ken Merckx.

Mandilok
Mandilok was the mouth-themed leader of the three General Orgs based on parts of the face and the hermaphrodite of the bunch. Its name is a pun on the word mandible. He has dozens of mouth all over his body, as well as both male and female voices and an appetite that could not be satisfied. It was revived by Jindrax and Toxica to destroy Viktor Adler and did so, but then treated the Duke Orgs like dirt. In battle, Mandilok used a giant fork and knife that could combine into a massive staff. These were used in the formation of the Nexus Blade. Mandilok could also breathe fire from the mouth with the male voice on his chest and shoot electricity from his hands. He had Toxica destroyed by forcing her to take a fatal blow from the Rangers' Jungle Blaster and was later killed by a returning Master Org, but was revived by him to help Retinax and Nayzor guard the Nexus during the Org Heart ceremony. It was destroyed again, but reappeared as part of Master Org's new body. 

Mandilok's upper female face is voiced by Barbara Goodson while the lower male face is voiced by Ezra Weisz.

Duke Orgs
The Dukes (of) Org serve Master Org and/or the Org Generals. Like the General Orgs, they have a single horn on their heads, but their capes tend to be shorter.

Toxica
Toxica is Jindrax's partner and best friend. A humanoid narwhal-like Duchess Org and the Mistress of Magic, she can resurrect fallen Orgs and cause them to grow by reciting the spell, "Evil spirits of toil and strife, give this fallen Org new life", and firing some magic beans from her staff, which grow into vines that recreate and enlarge the Org's body. She and Jindrax hid themselves for centuries after Master Org's defeat, and were the first to rejoin him in the Nexus when he re-emerged. Toxica grew suspicious of Master Org, when she saw him adjust his horn, something no real Org should be able to do. After General Nayzor was destroyed, Toxica temporarily used his crown to become the General Org Necronomica. This form was defeated by the Rangers and she regressed back to normal. Master Org was not pleased with Toxica's act and zapped her until Jindrax vouched for her. Toxica and Jindrax later received newer forms from Master Org when they exposed him and were brainwashed, becoming the submissive slaves Super Jindrax and Super Toxica. However, they were later freed, and unleashed the General Org Mandilok to aid them against Master Org. Duke Org Onikage tricked her into cutting off her horn, telling her that it would grow back (a lie) and without it, she would survive the painful effects of the Sacred water. While she was saved from the water's effects, the loss of her horn left her mortally weakened and she was soon destroyed by Mandilok when he used her as a human shield against the Rangers' Jungle Blaster. Jindrax then re-energized Toxica's severed horn by tricking the Rangers into firing the Jungle Blaster at it (backstabbing the Locomotive Org in the process), and used it to resurrect her from the Spirit world she was sent to after her death. She aided the Rangers by rescuing Princess Shayla, and then left with Jindrax to travel the world, "find themselves", and bid farewell. Curiously, the next day, Master Org's final body included a gauntlet on its right arm that resembled Toxica's helmet.

Toxica is played by Sin Wong who also voiced Necronomica and Super Toxica.

Jindrax
Jindrax is an Ibaraki-dōji-themed Duke Org, the Master of Blades and the best friend and partner of Toxica. and they serve as the primary henchman of Master Org. Jindrax is known for his skill with knives (and occasionally swords), and uses them constantly in battle - he was particularly a battle rival to Taylor. In a few episodes, he causes monsters to grow using Toxica's staff and reciting the spell, "Evil spirits of toil and strife, give this fallen Org new life!" He is also fond of the word "Inconceivable". He was later transformed and brainwashed, along with Toxica, into Super Jindrax by Master Org after they discovered that he was a human. He is released from this state after being defeated by the Animarium Armor, and set out with Toxica to free the general Org Mandilok; together, they were able to depose Master Org (having since lost his powers) and seemingly kill him for good. However, the two were mistreated under Mandilok, and Toxica was actually destroyed in battle with the Rangers. He has a brother named Juggelo, who was imprisoned along with the other Orgs 3000 years ago. Together, the two form "Team Carnival". In one episode, Jindrax ate Toxica's magic beans to grow large and fight alongside Juggelo. After Juggelo is destroyed, the effect of the beans wears off and Jindrax shrinks to his normal size. This makes him the only Org ever to grow large and return to normal (indeed, Toxica warned him that this was normally not possible). After Juggelo's death, Toxica joins Team Carnival in his stead. Jindrax later brought Toxica back from the Org Spirit World she had been sent to by charging her severed horn with energy from the Rangers' weapons. The two aided the Rangers in the final battle with Master Org, and then left to travel the world with Toxica, "find themselves", and bid farewell. Strangely, the next day, Master Org reappeared in a form with a left gauntlet or growth resembling the top of Jindrax's head.

Jindrax was voiced by Richard Cansino for four episodes, and later his suit actor Danny Wayne Stallcup who played Jindrax in his human-guise.

Zen-Aku
Zen-Aku is a wolf-themed Duke Org, cursed ages ago and imprisoned within the Wolf Mask. When Master Org defeated Animus, Merrick took it upon himself to defeat him. Knowing that he did not have enough power to defeat Master Org alone, he obtained the cursed Wolf Mask and used it to summon the Dark Wildzords. Although Merrick was able to defeat Master Org with the power of the Predazord, he was soon corrupted by the mask's power, allowing Zen-Aku to take control. With his willpower failing against the curse, Merrick begged his comrades to kill him before he killed them, but instead, they sealed him into a stone coffin to protect the world from Zen-Aku's power. Centuries later, Zen-Aku was released by Nayzor to destroy the Wild Force Rangers. As Zen-Aku, he battled them on several occasions, proving to be more than a match in battle - even stealing some of their Zords for himself - until the Rangers learned the truth about his past and helped free Merrick from the curse. As it turned out, Merrick's transformation was caused by the full moon, (similar to the transformation of a werewolf) and Zen-Aku's power was weaker during the waning of the moon and lunar eclipses. During a battle, Princess Shayla realized that the power of the curse was connected to the Predazord and told the Rangers to destroy it to break the curse. With help from the Rhino and Armadillo Wildzords, the Wild Force Megazord was able to destroy the Predazord, thus breaking the curse due to its power being connected to the Predazord. Unfortunately, when the Rangers broke the curse that corrupted the Predazord, they also lifted the original curse that trapped Zen-Aku in the wolf mask. After regenerating his true form, Zen-Aku and the Lunar Wolf Ranger fight, with Merrick being completely wrecked by Zen-Aku, who attempted to absorb him to regain the power he'd had when they were bonded together. Princess Shayla revealed that the curse had split Zen-Aku's power among the mask, Merrick, and his Zords; with the curse broken, it had all concentrated within Zen-Aku himself. When the Rangers finally convinced Merrick to accept their help, they were able to overwhelm Zen-Aku, but the Duke Org responded by growing in size. In this state, he overpowered both the Wild Force Megazord and Predazord, deflecting everything they threw at him. Fortunately, Merrick used a pool trick he'd learned from his friend Willie to send the Armadillo Zord flying into Zen-Aku's face, destroying his horn and badly weakening him. The Lunar Wolf Ranger then struck him with the Revolver Phantom, causing Zen-Aku to crumble to dust, seemingly defeated. In the finale, Zen-Aku is revealed to have survived and seeks redemption just like Merrick. They are last seen in or near a forest about to begin their journey together.

He was voiced by Dan Woren in earlier episodes and by Lex Lang in later episodes.

Artilla
Artilla is one of the Duke Orgs that were freed by Mandilok. A powerful tank-themed Duke Org with a cannon-shaped nose, he and Helicos attacked Turtle Cove and fought the Rangers. He was destroyed first by the Jungle Sword and then by the Isis Megazord with the Final Strike attack.

Artilla is voiced by Michael Sorich.

Helicos
Helicos is one of the Duke Orgs that were freed by Mandilok. A powerful helicopter-themed Duke Org that can fly, he and Artilla attacked Turtle Cove and fought the Rangers. He was destroyed first by the Falcon Summoner and then by the Isis Megazord's Final Strike attack.

Helicos is voiced by Dave Mallow.

Juggelo
Juggelo is a juggling Duke Org and Jindrax's brother. Together, he and his brother called themselves "Team Carnival." They attacked Taylor, Max, and Kite at a carnival, even to when Jindrax ate the growth seeds to join him. Juggelo was destroyed first by the Jungle Blaster's Savage Blast and then by the Wild Force Megazord Soul Cannon while Jindrax shrunk back to normal.

Juggelo is voiced by Patrick Thomas.

Onikage
Onikage is a ninja-themed Duke Org who appeared seemingly out of nowhere to aid Mandilok. However, he was actually working for Master Org and preparing things for his return. He wields a katana-like saber in battle, but his true ability lies in his illusion powers. He can turn himself invisible, generate holograms of varying complexity, and fire beams of light that create murderous clones of anyone they hit. Once he became gigantic, he also displayed the ability to rip open dimensions and transport others to the Org Spirit World, where he and the souls of deceased Orgs would team up on his unlucky victims. He succeeded in capturing Princess Shayla, getting rid of Toxica, and setting up Mandilok to be destroyed. Onikage then used his ninja powers to create the Shadow Rangers, evil clones of the Rangers, whom the Rangers could not damage without hurting themselves. Jindrax ruins his plans by reflecting one of his blasts back at him, creating a clone that Cole destroyed with the Falcon Summoner, thereby destroying Onikage as well. Thanks to Master Org, he returned as a giant and fought the Rangers in another dimension where the spirits of defeated Orgs reside. Princess Shayla's distress for her friends caused the Wildzords to form into the Pegasus Megazord on their own and travel into the other dimension to face Onikage. After a brief fight, he was destroyed by the Pegasus Megazord with the Pachyderm Crusher attack.

Onikage is voiced by Dan Woren.

Mut-Orgs
In the year 3000, only three Orgs remained of the once great army that battled Animaria. Imprisoned in statues, they were stumbled upon by Ransik. When he learned that his plan to over the world was the same as their own, he released them. They copied his DNA, combining the invulnerability of Mutants with their ancient Org powers. In exchange, they gave Ransik the power to pull weapons from his body. After Ransik's incarceration, the Mut-Orgs (pronounced "MutOrgs", "Mute Orgs" or Mutt-Orgs) who spoke their own language, which was English played in reverse escaped into the past to seek out Master Org. After thoroughly trouncing the Wild Force Rangers several times, they find him. However, the Mut-Orgs are then met in battle by the combined Time Force/Wild Force teams, as well as by a reformed Ransik. When they attempt to summon an energy blast, Ransik leaps in, taking the blast at point blank and causing it to wash back over them. As a result, their Mutant halves are destroyed, and their Org halves soon followed at the combined attacks of the Time Force and Wild Force Rangers. Their names are Takach, Kired, and Rofang. They were named after fans Jason Takach, Derik Smith, and Joe Rovang. They replace the Three Org Brothers from Gaoranger (Zeus Org, Poseidon Org, and Hades Org), since the latter's suits were reported to have been destroyed in a fire before filming could take place. Instead, the three Mut-Orgs are made up of parts of various other monster costumes in repainted form and with horns added onto the heads:

 Rofang has the repainted head and right arm of Body Switcher, the repainted body of Darkliptor, the sword of Cyborg Ecliptor, the left shoulder armor of Strikning, and the boots of Prince Gasket.
 Takach has the head and boots of Strikning, the repainted body of Gatekeeper, the left arm of unused Ohranger monster Bara Police, the right arm of unused GoGoV monster Jeeruda (referred to as "Abominus" in the Lightspeed Rescue video game while unused in the TV series), and the repainted weapons of Tire Org.
 Kired has the head and body of Deviot's Keonta-Spell form, the repainted right arm of Beetleborgs Metallix monster Repgillian, the wings of unused GoGoV monster Zairen (the inspiration for Mermatron in the Lightspeed Rescue video game who also briefly appears in an advanced form in "Sorcerer of the Sands"), and the boots of Radster.

Takach and Kired are voiced by David Lodge, and Rofang is voiced by Kim Strauss.

Putrids
The Putrids  are a weak and underdeveloped version of Org that serve as the Org army's foot soldiers. They are usually summoned by a pink slime from a conch shell-like container that Toxica carries with her. They are basically young Orgs, with their underdeveloped horns indicating their (lack of) strength. They wield kanabos in battle, which can also launch massive blasts of flame. When Toxica pours her slime on the ground and the Putrids form, similar to Ivan Ooze's foot soldiers Oozemen and/or Tengu Warriors, they perform a strange dance where they keep touching their heads. Because of this, one can assume that an Org's weak spot is his/her horn (and perhaps their greatest shame is to have the horn severed).

Org Monsters
The Org monsters first appear as spirits that possess an object, basing their forms and powers on the nature of the inanimate non-living object. Unlike the Duke Orgs, they have two horns. When beaten, their bodies dissolve into pale green ooze. To make an Org grow, Toxica would perform a spell while chanting: "Evil spirits of toil and strife, give this fallen Org new life!" After this chant, Toxica would thrust her staff forward, launching seeds at the Org ooze; upon implantation, the seeds rapidly grow into twisted vines that reconstitute the fallen Org as a giant.

 Plug Org (voiced by Tom Wyner) - As a result of an Org Spirit acquiring a plug, it's one of two Orgs that attacked Turtle Cove. He performs a combination attack with Turbine Org. It was destroyed by the Jungle Sword.
 Turbine Org (voiced by Steve Kramer) - As a result of an Org Spirit acquiring a turbine, it's one of two Orgs that attacked Turtle Cove. He performs a combination attack with Plug Org. It was destroyed by the Wild Zords.
 Barbed Wire Org (voiced by David Lodge) - As a result of an Org Spirit acquiring some barbed wire on a fence, it attacked Turtle Cove. It was destroyed by the Wild Force Megazord.
 Camera Org (voiced by Michael Sorich) - As a result of an Org Spirit acquiring a camera, it had the ability to steal the body of people rendering them invisible. It was destroyed by the Wild Force Megazord.
 Bell Org (voiced by Bob Papenbrook) - As a result of an Org Spirit acquiring a church bell, it can smack himself with a hammer to perform deadly sound attacks. He could also trap anybody by dropping a large bell on top of them, torturing them at his leisure by banging his hammer on their metal prison. It was destroyed by the Wild Force Megazord.
 Tire Org (voiced by Derek Stephen Prince) - As a result of an Org Spirit acquiring a tire, it has the ability to turn into a wheel, gaining great speed and agility. It was destroyed by the Wild Force Megazord Sword and Shield Mode.
 Ship Org (voiced by Mike Reynolds) - As a result of an Org Spirit passing between two ships, it was quite strong, had hard armor, a round wooden shield, and a huge anchor for use as a weapon. Unfortunately, he is unintelligent, independent, and incredibly aggressive, as he attacked both the Rangers and the Putrids. It was destroyed by the Wild Force Megazord Spear Mode.
 Cell Phone Org (voiced by William Holmes) - As a result of an Org Spirit acquiring a cell phone, it had the ability to use a jamming field that was enough to disable the Growl Phones. It was destroyed by the Wild Force Megazord Double Knuckle.
 Bulldozer Org (voiced by Jason Faunt) - As a result of an Org Spirit acquiring a bulldozer, it was a strong Org that aimlessly wandered around a forest and chopped down trees until he found Jindrax and Toxica. It was destroyed by the Kongazord.
 Freezer Org (voiced by Billy Forester) - As a result of an Org Spirit acquiring a refrigerator, it displayed the ability to expel icy winds from a hole between his eyes. It used his Icy Grip move to destroy himself to freeze the Kongazord. Before it exploded, Retinax shouted to him that his sacrifice will be remembered.
 Vacuum Cleaner Org (voiced by Dave Mallow) - As a result of an Org Spirit acquiring a vacuum cleaner, it has the ability to suck things toward him. It was destroyed by the Wild Force Megazord Sword and Shield Mode.
 Bus Org (voiced by David Leisure) - As a result of an Org Spirit acquiring a bus, it can take the form of a bus. It was destroyed by the Wild Force Megazord.
 Motorcycle Org (voiced by Kirk Thornton) - When Taylor first fought this Org in the form of Scooter Org, she could not defeat him on her own. Princess Shayla had to seal him with a spell instead. When Zen-Aku releases him a year later, he has powered up into Motorcycle Org. It was destroyed by the Jungle Sword.
 Lawnmower Org (voiced by Kim Strauss) - As a result of an Org Spirit acquiring a lawnmower, it had razor-sharp blades on his arms and mower-like lower body. It was destroyed by Zen-Aku.
 Quadra Org (voiced by Frank Adelia) - A powerful chimeric Org created from the stolen Animal Crystals of the Elephant, Giraffe, Black Bear, and Polar Bear Wildzords. Its body incorporates all four animals where he has an elephant head on his chest, a giraffe head on his forehead, a black bear head on his left shoulder, and a polar bear head on his right shoulder. In addition to his high battle power, he can launch constricting tentacles from the elephant trunk arm, emit lightning beams from his giraffe and elephant eyes, emit fire from the black bear head, and emit ice from the polar bear head. It was destroyed by the Wild Force Megazord Striker and the Predazord.
 Karaoke Org (voiced by Monica Louwerens) - As a result of an Org Spirit acquiring a karaoke system, it has a devastating singing attack and can launch CDs. It was destroyed by the Wild Force Megazord Striker and the Predazord.
 Signal Org (voiced by Tony Oliver) - As a result of an Org Spirit acquiring a traffic signal, it can attack with the lights emitted from his signal lights. It was responsible for giving Cole amnesia during the first battle. It was destroyed by the Wild Force Megazord Spear Mode.
 Bowling Org (voiced by Richard Epcar) - As a result of an Org Spirit acquiring a bowling ball that Jindrax threw down an alley, it had a devastating bowling attack. It was destroyed by the Wild Force Megazord Predator Mode.
 Wedding Dress Org (voiced by Peggy O'Neal) - As a result of an Org Spirit acquiring a wedding dress, it abducted brides and turned them into wedding mannequins. It was destroyed by the Wild Force Megazord Sword and Shield Mode.
 Samurai Org (voiced by Tom Wyner) - As a result of an Org Spirit acquiring a samurai doll, it specializes in martial arts. It was destroyed by the Kongazord Double Knuckle after the White Tiger Zord destroyed his weapon.
 Tombstone Org (voiced by Stephen Apostolina) - Master Org infused Dr. Victor Adler's tombstone with the spirits of Turbine, Camera, Freezer, Bus, Karaoke, and Samurai Orgs to create the Tombstone Org, making it one of the most powerful Orgs (although he is not as powerful as Quadra Org, the Mut-Orgs, and Locomotive Org). It was destroyed by the Wild Force Megazord Clutcher Mode.
 Flute Org (voiced by Monica Louwerens) - As a result of an Org Spirit acquiring a flute, it interrupts Shayla and Merrick's performance for the Deer Zord and is powered up from Toxica and Jindrax's energy by Mandilok. At first she only made children dance under her control, but received a power up that makes the Rangers dance under her control. It was destroyed by the Isis Megazord after Animus destroyed her flute.
 Lion Tamer Org (voiced by Tom Wyner) - It was not revealed what an Org Spirit acquired to become the Lion Tamer Org. It had the ability to control animals with his whip like a circus, which spreads to the point of being able to control the Wildzords. It was destroyed by the Isis Megazord.
 Monitor Org (voiced by Kerrigan Mahan) - As a result of an Org Spirit acquiring a video monitor and some junk, it rises from the garbage pile and sucks people in from their monitors, allowing him to take all the people from a stadium. It was destroyed by the Wild Force Megazord.
 Toy Org (voiced by Steve McGowan) - As a result of an Org Spirit acquiring a toy robot, it can shoot fire from his hands and use toy-themed weapons. It was destroyed by Animus and the Predazord Blue Moon.
 Clock Org - As a result of an Org Spirit acquiring a clock, it was a defeated Org who Onikage brought back as a spiritual illusion.
 Locomotive Org (voiced by Michael Sorich) - As a result of an Org Spirit acquiring a train, it was a very powerful Org with incredible strength, heavy and thick armor, and the ability to launch fire from his furnace-like mouth. It was destroyed by the Isis Megazord Predator Mode.

Machine Empire Remnants
Years after Countdown to Destruction in the Power Rangers Wild Force episode Forever Red, the last generals of the Machine Empire gathered on the moon. Determined to obtain revenge for the destruction of their beloved monarch King Mondo after what happened to him in the "Countdown to Destruction" event, they set out to resurrect Serpentera. Led by the Generals Venjix, Tezzla, Gerrok, Steelon, and Automon, the Machine Empire unearthed the giant Zord and placed a neo-plutonium core inside to power it. However, just as they were about to board Serpentera, a team of 10 Red Rangers arrived on the moon. The Generals battled the Rangers, and Tezzla, Gerrok, Steelon, and Automon were destroyed. Venjix escaped to Serpentera, which he flew towards Earth. However, the Red Wild Force Ranger used his Wild Force Rider to reflect Serpentera's blast back into it. The Zord was destroyed, along with Venjix and the Machine Empire.

It should also be noted that the Machine Empire Remnants are really recycled Big Bad Beetleborgs/Beetleborgs Metallix costumes. Due to the use of these Beetleborg costumes, the Machine Empire Generals appear to be more technologically advanced than the rest of the Machine Empire including the Royal House of Gadgetry itself.

General Venjix
Four years after the destruction of the Machine Empire, surviving members of the Empire remain seeking to destroy the Earth. Tezzla, Gerrok, Steelon, and Automon (and many Cogs) are all that is left of the Empire, as well as General Venjix, their leader. They have recently learned that Earth's Moon is the resting place of Serpentera, a gigantic War Zord created by Lord Zedd with the power to destroy a whole planet. Ever since Lord Zedd was changed into a human being, this happened in "Countdown to Destruction", the location of Serpentera remained a mystery for many years. Venjix finds it and begins using Cog soldiers to dig it up, refitting it with a Neo Plutonium reactor to power it. Venjix and his other Generals prepare to board Serpentera, but they are then interrupted by the Red Rangers. Venjix sends Cogs to distract the eight Rangers while he and the others flee to Serpentera. The Rangers battle the Cogs unmorphed and easily defeat them. Eventually, Cole escapes the barrage of Cogs and chases after the Generals. Venjix fires at him, but Cole is rescued by Leo and Aurico on Leo's Jet Jammer. Then all the 10 Red Rangers gather, morph with their respective morphing calls (except for Aurico, who has already morphed), and battle the Generals. Red Wild Force Ranger Cole Evans and Red Mighty Morphing Ranger Jason Lee Scott fight Venjix, Cole having trouble at first but coming back strong after Jason single-handedly overwhelms Venjix with a corkscrew kick to show off to Cole.

Cole later severely damages Venjix with his Crystal Saber (Blazing Lion attack). Battle-damaged, Venjix then jumps into Serpentera and takes off. The Rangers fear they have failed, but Cole calls upon his Wild Force Rider to battle Venjix. Cole uses the Wild Force Rider to fly into Serpentera and destroy it from the inside. Both Venjix and Serpentera are finally destroyed, and Cole ends up surviving the explosion despite the others' momentarily thinking he may have been destroyed too.

General Venjix is voiced by Archie Kao, who previously played Kai Chen on Power Rangers Lost Galaxy.

Tezzla
She fought and engaged the Quantum Ranger Eric Myers and Red Alien Ranger Aurico, they destroyed her with great team work and Eric using his Quantum Defender.

Tezzla is voiced by Catherine Sutherland.

Gerrok
He battled the Red Zeo Ranger Tommy Oliver and Red Time Force Ranger Wesley Collins, Tommy destroys him with the Zeo Flying Power Kick.

Gerrok is voiced by Walter Emanuel Jones.

Steelon
He engaged Red Space Ranger Andros and Red Lightspeed Rescue Ranger Carter Grayson, who destroyed him by combining power from their Astro, Rescue, and Thermo Blasters.

Steelon is voiced by an uncredited Scott Page-Pagter.

Automon
He fought against Red Turbo Ranger T. J. Johnson and Red Lost Galaxy Ranger Leo Corbett as they destroy him with their Quasar Saber, Transdagger, Turbo Blade, and Turbo Lightning Sword attack.

Automon is voiced by an uncredited David Walsh.

Notes

References

External links
Official Power Rangers Website

Television characters introduced in 2002
Wild Force
Characters